Cairo Bank Uganda Limited (CBUL), formerly known as Cairo International Bank (CIB), is a commercial bank in Uganda. It is licensed by the Bank of Uganda, the central bank and national banking regulator.  It is a subsidiary of Egypt-based banking group, Banque du Caire Group.

Headquarters location 
Cairo Bank Uganda has its headquarters at Lotis Towers, at Plot 16 Mackinnon Road, Nakasero Hill, in the central business district of Kampala, Uganda's capital city. The geographical coordinates of the bank's headquarters are: 0°19'17.0"N, 32°35'05.0"E (Latitude:0.321389; Longitude:32.584722).

Overview 
CBUL focuses on serving small and medium businesses (SMEs), educational institutions, non-governmental organizations and corporate entities. In 2020, the bank re-branded and turned its focus on meeting the banking needs of SMEs. Cairo Bank Uganda Limited is a fully owned subsidiary by Banque du Caire (BDC), an Egypt-based financial services conglomerate with total assets in excess of US$12 billion, as of September 2020.

As of December 2019 the total assets of Cairo Bank Uganda were valued at USh189 billion (US$51.4 million) with shareholders' equity of USh52.3 billion (US$14.2 million).

History
Incorporated as Cairo International Bank in 1995, the bank began operations in the same year following the issuance of a commercial banking license by the Bank of Uganda. In 2020, Banque du Caire, which owned 62.4 percent of the shares of stock of the Ugandan subsidiary, acquired the 24 percent shareholding owned by Bank Misr and the 13.6 percent owned by Bank of Egypt, to become the sole owner of 100 percent of the tock of the Ugandan bank.

Management board 
Cairo Bank Uganda (CBU)  is governed by an eight-person board of directors. Sylvia Jagwe Owachi is the  Acting Managing Director. She replaced Ahmad Maher Nada, the previous CEO, who left CBU and take up an assignment at Banque du Caire in Egypt, effective January 2022. He served as MD/CEO at CBU for three and one half years.

Branch network 
CBU  has the following branches, as of September 2020:

1. Main Branch : Lotis Towers, Plot 16 - Mackinnon Road, Nakasero, Kampala.

2. Kampala Road Branch: Greenland Towers, Plot 30 Kampala Road, Kampala.

3. Kikuubo Branch: Shamba Complex, Kyagwe Road, Kampala.

4. Garden City Branch: Garden City Shopping Mall, Yusuf Lule Road, Kampala.

5. Bugoloobi Branch: Plot 1-5 Spring Close, Bugoloobi, Kampala.

6. Bweyogerere Branch: Bweyogerere, Kira Town.

7. Mbarara Branch: Rwebikona Building, Mbarara – Fort Portal Road, Mbarara.

Rebranding
In September 2020, Cairo International Bank Limited changed its name to Cairo Bank Uganda Limited, relocated to new headquarter premises and changed focus to SME customers.

See also
 List of banks in Uganda
 Banking in Uganda
 Banque du Caire
 National Bank of Egypt

References

External links
 Cairo Bank Uganda Website
  Bank of Uganda Website
  Revealed: How Pension Billions Left Cairo Bank

Banks of Uganda
Kampala Central Division
Companies based in Kampala
Banks established in 1995
1995 establishments in Uganda